Grace Alache Jerry is a Nigerian disability-activist, human rights advocate, a musician and beauty pageant queen who was awarded the Miss Wheelchair Nigeria. Jerry is the executive director of Inclusive Friends Association. She has performed in concerts within and out Nigeria. She is a 2015 Mandela Washington Fellow and was honored by President Barack Obama.

References

Living people
Nigerian women musicians
Nigerian beauty pageant winners
Year of birth missing (living people)
Nigerian disability rights activists